The 2000 Hamilton Tiger-Cats season was the 43rd season for the team in the Canadian Football League and their 51st overall. The Tiger-Cats finished in 2nd place in the East Division with a 9–9–0–2 record in the first CFL season that awarded points to overtime losses. The Tiger-Cats failed to defend their Grey Cup title when they lost to the Winnipeg Blue Bombers in the East Semi-Final.

Offseason

CFL Draft

Preseason

Regular season

Season standings

Schedule

Postseason

Awards and honours

2000 CFL All-Stars
 Joe Montford - Defensive End

References

Hamilton Tiger-Cats seasons
Hamilton